Megacolia azurea is a species of scoliid wasp found in parts of tropical Asia. These are among the largest wasps and several subspecies have been described. Their larvae are parasitoids mainly of Scarabeoid larvae.

 Megascolia (Regiscolia) azurea azurea 
 Megascolia (Regiscolia) azurea Christiana 
 Megascolia (Regiscolia) azurea siamensis  
 Megascolia (Regiscolia) azurea cochinensis  
 Megascolia (Regiscolia) azurea hindostana

References 

Scoliidae